The 2007 MAC Championship Game was played on December 1, 2007 at Ford Field in Detroit, Michigan. The game featured the winner of each division of the Mid-American Conference. The game featured the Miami RedHawks, of the East Division, and the Central Michigan Chippewas, of the West Division. The Chippewas beat the RedHawks 35–10. This was Central Michigan's second straight Mid-American Conference championship.

References

Championship Game
MAC Championship Game
Central Michigan Chippewas football games
Miami RedHawks football games
American football competitions in Detroit
December 2007 sports events in the United States
MAC Championship
2007 in Detroit